Bernard Héréson (born 8 January 1969) is a French former football defender.

References

External links
 

1969 births
Living people
French footballers
Stade Lavallois players
Paris Saint-Germain F.C. players
RC Lens players
Stade Malherbe Caen players
US Créteil-Lusitanos players
FC Rouen players
Association football defenders
Ligue 1 players
Ligue 2 players